Clodovaldo Ruffato (Santa Giustina in Colle, 8 May 1953) is an Italian politician from Veneto.

A long-time Christian Democrat and close ally of Vittorio Casarin, he was first elected to the Regional Council of Veneto in 2005 for Forza Italia. Re-elected in 2010 for The People of Freedom, he was elected President of the Regional Council by the assembly.

References

1953 births
Living people
Forza Italia politicians
The People of Freedom politicians
21st-century Italian politicians
People from the Province of Padua
Presidents of the regional council of Veneto